Englishman refers to English people.

Englishman may also refer to:

People
Jason Englishman, Canadian rock music singer and guitarist
Jenny-Bea Englishman, real name of the Canadian singer Esthero
Erald Briscoe, reggae musician who records under the name Englishman
Carlos Babington (born 1949), Argentine former football striker known as "El Inglés" (the Englishman)

Places
Englishman Bay, Washington County, Maine, United States
Englishman River, Vancouver Island, British Columbia, Canada
Englishman River (Maine), Washington County, Maine, United States

Other uses
Englishman (album), by Barrington Levy

See also
Anglicus (disambiguation), a list of people so named